Clifford Tobin DeYoung (born February 12, 1945) is an American actor and musician.

Life and career
DeYoung was born in Los Angeles, California, United States. He is a 1968 graduate of California State University, Los Angeles.

Before his acting career, he was the lead singer of the 1960s rock group Clear Light, which played the same concerts with acts such as The Doors, Jimi Hendrix, and Janis Joplin. After the band broke up, he starred in the Broadway production of Hair and the Tony Award-winning Sticks and Bones. After four years in New York, he moved back to California to star in the television film Sunshine (1973), and featuring the songs of John Denver. There was also a short-lived television series based on the film. The song "My Sweet Lady" from the film reached No. 17 on the Billboard Hot 100 in 1974, No. 14 in Canada and No. 42 in Australia. "Sunshine Christmas", a sequel, was produced in 1977.

Since then, DeYoung has appeared in more than 80 films and television series, including Harry and Tonto (1974), The Lindbergh Kidnapping Case (1976), Captains and the Kings (1976), The 3,000 Mile Chase (1977), Centennial (1978) as John Skimmerhorn, Blue Collar (1978) as an FBI agent, Shock Treatment (the 1981 sequel to The Rocky Horror Picture Show) in which he played twin characters who sang a duet with each other, Master of the Game (1984) as Brad Rogers, and Flight of the Navigator (1986) in which he played Bill, David's father. Also in the 1980s, he made a guest appearance on Murder, She Wrote, like fellow Navigator actor Joey Cramer. In 1987 he guest-starred in the television show Beauty and the Beast as the specialist in voodoo Professor Alexander Ross. In the 1989 Civil War film Glory, he played Union Colonel James Montgomery. Other projects included the films Suicide Kings (1997) and Last Flight Out (2004).

He has guest-starred on Star Trek: Deep Space Nine (in the episode "Vortex"); as reporter Chuck DePalma in four episodes of JAG; Rep. Kimball in the episode "The Day Before" on The West Wing; and as John Bonacheck, Amber Ashby's kidnapper, on The Young and the Restless in 2007.

In 2010, DeYoung appeared in Monte Hellman's independent romantic thriller Road to Nowhere.

In the 2014 film Wild he played Ed, a summer resident of the Kennedy Meadows Campground on the Pacific Crest Trail.

Filmography

Film

Pilgrimage (1972) - Garry
Harry and Tonto (1974) - Burt Jr.
Blue Collar (1978) - John Burrows
Shock Treatment (1981) - Brad Majors / Farley Flavors
Independence Day (1983) - Les Morgan
The Hunger (1983) - Tom Haver
Reckless (1984) - Phil Barton
Protocol (1984) - Hilley
Secret Admirer (1985) - George Ryan
F/X (1986) - Lipton
Flight of the Navigator (1986) - Bill Freeman
The Survivalist (1987) - Dr. Vincent Ryan
Pulse (1988) - Bill
Forbidden Sun (1988) - Professor Lake
In Dangerous Company (1988) - Blake
Fear (1988) - Don Haden
Rude Awakening (1989) - Agent Brubaker
Glory (1989) - Col. James M. Montgomery
Flashback (1990) - Sheriff Hightower
To Die Standing (1991) - Shaun Broderick
Immortal Sins (1991) - Mike
Dr. Giggles (1992) - Tom Campbell
The Skateboard Kid (1993) - Big Dan
Revenge of the Red Baron (1994) - Richard Spencer
Terminal Voyage (1994) - Granier
Carnosaur 2 (1995) - Maj. Tom McQuade
The Substitute (1996) - Wolson
The Craft (1996) - Mr. Bailey
Suicide Kings (1997) - Marty
Last Flight Out (2004) - Tony Williams
Stone and Ed (2008) - Mr. Schwartz
Solar Flare (2008) - Dr. Kline
2012: Doomsday  (2008) - Lloyd
Road to Nowhere (2010) - Cary Stewart / Rafe Taschen
Wild (2014) - Ed
Reality Queen! (2020) - Joe Logo

Television
Sunshine (1973, TV Movie) - Sam Hayden
The Night That Panicked America (1975, TV Movie) - Stefan Grubowski
Centennial (1978-1979) - John Skimmerhorn
Family (1979, Episode 6: "Whispers") - Alex Canfield
Beauty and the Beast (1987, Episode 9: "Dark Spirit") - Alexander Ross
Murder, She Wrote (1988-1992) - Mason Porter / Carlton Reid / Father Patrick Francis
The Tommyknockers (1993, TV Mini-Series) - Joe Paulson
Star Trek Deep Space 9 (1993, Episode 11) - Croden
The X-Files (1993, Episode 1: "Pilot") - Dr. Jay Nemman
RoboCop (Canadian TV series) (1994) - Dr. Cray Z. Mallardo
Deliberate Intent (2000, TV Movie) - Tom Kelly
 Alias (TV Series)  (2005, Season 4, Episode 11 "The Road Home") 
Grey's Anatomy (2008, Season 5, Episodes 1 & 2 "Dream a little dream of me" Parts 1 & 2) - Phil Loomis
 Young Riders 1990 (Season 1, episode 16 "Unfinished Business") -Evan Crandall
 Andersonville 1996 TV movie- Sgt. Gleason

References

External links

 

1945 births
Living people
20th-century American male actors
21st-century American male actors
American male film actors
American male musical theatre actors
American male singers
American male television actors
California State University, Los Angeles alumni
Male actors from Los Angeles
MCA Records artists